れ, in hiragana, or レ in katakana, is one of the Japanese kana, each of which represents one mora. The hiragana is written in two strokes, while katakana in one. Both represent the sound . The shapes of these kana have origins in the character 礼. The Ainu language uses a small katakana ㇾ to represent a final r sound after an e sound (エㇾ er). The combination of an R-column kana letter with handakuten ゜- れ゚ in hiragana, and レ゚ in katakana was introduced to represent [le] in the early 20th century.

Stroke order

Other communicative representations

 Full Braille representation

 Computer encodings

See also

 Japanese phonology

References

Specific kana